Du Pont is a town in Clinch County, Georgia, United States. The population was 120 at the 2010 census.

According to the 1916 History of Clinch County the town was first settled around 1856 as Lawton, on the route of the newly chartered Atlantic and Gulf Railroad.  During the Civil War, a branch line from Lawton to Live Oak, Florida, was built to assist the movement of Confederate troops and supplies, but was not completed until 1865, when the war was nearly over.  The town was renamed in 1874 after J. P. A. DuPont, an early settler.  It was incorporated as a city in 1889.

Geography

Du Pont is located in northwestern Clinch County at  (30.9896, -82.8707). U.S. Route 84 passes through the center of the town, leading east  to Homerville, the county seat, and west  to Stockton.

Demographics

As of the census of 2000, there were 139 people, 57 households, and 42 families residing in the town. The racial makeup of the town was 61.87% White and 38.13% African American. Hispanic or Latino people of any race were 2.16% of the population.

There were 57 households, out of which 31.6% had children under the age of 18 living with them, 54.4% were married couples living together, 17.5% had a female householder with no husband present, and 24.6% were non-families. 24.6% of all households were made up of individuals, and 10.5% had someone living alone who was 65 years of age or older. The average household size was 2.44 and the average family size was 2.88.

In the town, the population was spread out, with 25.2% under the age of 18, 5.0% from 18 to 24, 30.9% from 25 to 44, 25.2% from 45 to 64, and 13.7% who were 65 years of age or older. The median age was 38 years. For every 100 females, there were 90.4 males. For every 100 females age 18 and over, there were 92.6 males.

The median income for a household in the town was $34,375, and the median income for a family was $40,250. Males had a median income of $22,250 versus $21,875 for females. The per capita income for the town was $16,128. There were 23.4% of families and 29.3% of the population living below the poverty line, including 32.5% of under eighteens and 53.6% of those over 64.

References

Towns in Clinch County, Georgia
Towns in Georgia (U.S. state)